Convocation Hall is a domed rotunda on the grounds of the University of Toronto in Toronto, Ontario, Canada. Designed by Darling and Pearson and completed in 1907, its radially planned interior has been compared to the grand amphitheatre of the Sorbonne and the Sheldonian Theatre at Oxford, although no specific precedent is truly known. While the building's namesake purpose is to host the annual convocation ceremonies, it also serves as the venue for academic and social functions that involve large audiences throughout the year.

History

In the latter half of the 19th century, the university began to see the need for a considerably larger ceremonial auditorium beyond the confines of University College, made more apparent by a fire that damaged much of the college in 1890. The construction of Convocation Hall was mainly financed by $50,000 raised by the University of Toronto Alumni Association and matching funds provided by Ontario government. The cornerstone was laid in 1904 and the construction completed three years later at almost twice the originally estimated cost.

Major additions and expansions to the building occurred in 1912 when a large pipe organ was installed in the auditorium, and in 1947 with an alteration and addition to the examination hall. The building would not become equipped with air conditioning until 1997. In 2006, a major restoration and refurbishment was undertaken by E.R.A Architects with funding from the alumni association. Work entailed refurbishing seats, restoration of grandeur of the circular foyer including decorative finishes, historical millwork, lighting installations, installing accessible washrooms and a fresh coat of paint, and restoration of the historic pipe organ—the fifth largest in Toronto. The next year, Convocation Hall celebrated its centennial.

Over the years, Convocation Hall has served as the venue for major events and performances. Songs on Premiata Forneria Marconi's album Live in USA were recorded at the hall in 1974. Bob Marley & The Wailers performed two shows of the Rastaman Vibration Tour there in 1976.  Other popular musical performances during the 1960s and 1970s included appearances by Frank Zappa, Van Morrison, Mahavishnu Orchestra and Captain Beefheart. Zimbabwean President Robert Mugabe gave an address to a capacity crowd there in the 1980s. The building hosted a recording of musician Hayden's live album, titled simply Live at Convocation Hall, in 2002.  In 2007, former Vice President of the United States Al Gore delivered a public lecture on climate change at Convocation Hall and presented his documentary film, An Inconvenient Truth. In 2009, Michael Ignatieff was at the hall to launch his book, True Patriot Love. The building also appeared in the film Mean Girls and in the pilot episode of the television series Fringe.

Architecture

Convocation Hall is an important University landmark, designed by one of Toronto's most prominent and prolific firms. Architect Frank Darling of Darling and Pearson was influenced by the Edwardian Baroque revival in architecture. There is an emphasis on principles of proportion, symmetry, geometry and uniformity of parts while accepting a freer use of classical forms common to the period. The Hall's radial design enhances its graduation assembly experience and for some conveys messages of centrality and inclusiveness. The purpose of the radial form was to make Convocation Hall both the metaphorical and physical centre of the expanding University and to anchor a newly rationalized campus layout.

Convocation Hall's circular mass is emphasized by its shallow copper-clad dome and its curved entablature, supported by two-storey unfluted Ionic order porticos. A large glass oculus allows natural lighting into the centre of the large hall beneath. Supporting the dome are arched structural ribs which are connected by smaller arched bays between the balcony seating on the third floor of the Hall. Main exterior materials are two tones of buff brick, limestone and copper.

With a seating capacity of 1,731, Convocation Hall comprises four storeys, including two main seating floors. Attached in the rear of Convocation Hall are an examination hall that formerly served as exhibition space, and Simcoe Hall (also designed by Darling), which houses the university's executive offices.

See also

List of oldest buildings and structures in Toronto
University of Toronto, Faculty of Music

References

External links

University of Toronto, Official Homepage
University of Toronto, Office of Convocation
University of Toronto, Office of Space Management

University of Toronto buildings
Darling and Pearson buildings
Music venues in Toronto
Theatres in Toronto
Neoclassical architecture in Canada
Buildings and structures completed in 1907